Cercospora medicaginis is a plant pathogen.

References

medicaginis
Fungal plant pathogens and diseases